Crawford County is a county in the U.S. state of Michigan. Its population was 12,988 as of the 2020 census. The county seat of Crawford County is Grayling, the county's only incorporated community.

Crawford County is located in the Northern Lower Peninsula of Michigan. It contains land within three of Michigan's largest watersheds, belonging to the Au Sable, Manistee, and Muskegon rivers.

History

The county is named for Col. William Crawford, a Revolutionary War soldier killed in 1782 while fighting Native Americans in Ohio. It was created by the Michigan Legislature in 1840 as Shawono County, then renamed Crawford County in 1843. "Shawono" was derived from an Ojibwe word, zhaawanong, meaning "from the south". The county was administered by a succession of other Michigan counties prior to the organization of county government in 1879.

Geography
The county is part of Northern Michigan.

The county is part of the Au Sable State Forest, specifically the Grayling FMU (Alcona, Crawford, Oscoda, and northern Iosco counties). Glaciers shaped the area, creating a unique regional ecosystem. A large portion of the area is the so-called Grayling outwash plain, which consists of broad outwash plain including sandy ice-disintegration ridges; jack pine barrens, some white pine-red pine forest, and northern hardwood forest. Large lakes were created by glacial action.

Major highways

 
 
 
 
 
 
 
 
 
County Highway 612

Adjacent counties

 Otsego County - north
 Montmorency County - northeast
 Oscoda County - east
 Ogemaw County - southeast
 Roscommon County - south
 Missaukee County - southwest
 Kalkaska County - west
 Antrim County - northwest

National protected area
 Huron National Forest (part)

Demographics

As of the census of 2000, there were 14,273 people, 5,625 households, and 4,038 families residing in the county. The population density was 26 people per square mile (10/km2). There were 10,042 housing units at an average density of 18 per square mile (7/km2). The racial makeup of the county was 96.38% White, 1.50% Black or African American, 0.60% Native American, 0.25% Asian, 0.02% Pacific Islander, 0.20% from other races, and 1.05% from two or more races. 0.99% of the population were Hispanic or Latino of any race. 24.8% were of German, 12.5% English, 10.1% American, 8.9% Irish, 7.4% Polish and 5.9% French ancestry. 97.7% spoke English and 1.5% Spanish as their first language.

There were 5,625 households, out of which 30.00% had children under the age of 18 living with them, 57.60% were married couples living together, 9.70% had a female householder with no husband present, and 28.20% were non-families. 24.00% of all households were made up of individuals, and 10.50% had someone living alone who was 65 years of age or older. The average household size was 2.45 and the average family size was 2.87.

In the county, the population was spread out, with 24.50% under the age of 18, 6.30% from 18 to 24, 26.60% from 25 to 44, 26.00% from 45 to 64, and 16.60% who were 65 years of age or older. The median age was 41 years. For every 100 females there were 104.00 males. For every 100 females age 18 and over, there were 100.40 males.

The median income for a household in the county was $33,364, and the median income for a family was $37,056. Males had a median income of $31,504 versus $21,250 for females. The per capita income for the county was $16,903. About 10.00% of families and 12.70% of the population were below the poverty line, including 17.60% of those under age 18 and 7.60% of those age 65 or over.

Government

The county government operates the jail, maintains rural roads, operates the major local courts,
keeps files of deeds and mortgages, maintains vital records, administers public health regulations, and
participates with the state in the provision of welfare and other social services. The county
board of commissioners controls the budget but has only limited authority to make laws or ordinances. In
Michigan, most local government functions — police and fire, building and zoning, tax assessment, street
maintenance, etc. — are the responsibility of individual cities and townships.

Elected officials
 Prosecuting Attorney: Sierra Koch
 Sheriff: Shawn M Kraycs
 County Clerk/Register of Deeds: Sandra M. Moore
 County Treasurer: Kate Wagner

(information as of June 2019l)

Communities

City
 Grayling

Charter township
 Grayling Charter Township

Civil townships
 Beaver Creek Township
 Frederic Township
 Lovells Township
 Maple Forest Township
 South Branch Township

Unincorporated communities

 Babbits Resort
 Collens Landing
 Danish Landing
 Deerheart Valley
 Eldorado
 Five Corners
 Forbush Corner
 Frederic
 Ishaward
 Lake Margrethe
 Louis Cabin Landing
 Lovells
 McIntyre Landing
 Rasmus
 Skyline Village
 Wildwood

Ghost towns
 Bucks
 Deward
 Pere Cheney

Historical markers
There are six recognized Michigan historical markers in the county:
 Beginning of State Reforestation
 Chief Shoppenagon / Shoppenagon's Homesite
 The Douglas House / Thomas E. Douglas
 Michigan Grayling
 Officer's Club
 32nd Red Arrow Division

See also
 List of counties in Michigan
 List of Michigan State Historic Sites in Crawford County, Michigan
 National Register of Historic Places listings in Crawford County, Michigan

References

External links
 
 Crawford County government
 Enchanted forest, Northern Michigan source for information, calendars, etc.

 
Michigan counties
1879 establishments in Michigan
Populated places established in 1879